Therapeio is a village in the northern part of the Evros regional unit in Greece. It is located near the border with Bulgaria, on the left bank of the river Ardas, between the villages Milia to the west, and Komara to the east. Therapeio is in the municipal unit of Trigono. In 2011 its population was 86.

Population

See also

List of settlements in the Evros regional unit

External links
Therapeio on GTP Travel Pages

References

Populated places in Evros (regional unit)